Cargreen is a small settlement in southeast Cornwall, England, United Kingdom. It is situated beside the River Tamar approximately two miles (3 km) north of Saltash. It is in the civil parish of Landulph.

Cargreen has a yacht club and once had a thriving industry ferrying flowers across the river to Devon.

"The earliest known reference to Cargreen was in 1018 when the bounds of the manor of Tinnel mentioned "Carrecron". It was then probably no more than, as the name implies (in Cornish), an outbreak of hard rock jutting into the Tamar."

Cargreen is mentioned in John Leland's The Antiquary 1534-43: "Myles fro Asshe [Saltash] Northward ynto the Land is a smaul Village cawled Caregrin, Est of this is Bere Parke and Hous in Devonshire dividid from Caregrin tantum Tamara."

The BBC TV series The Coroner features the now-closed Crooked Spaniards Inn, shown on the right, as the set for The Black Dog Inn. As of 2021, the pub remains closed although its surrounding buildings have been converted into holiday accommodation.

References

External links

Villages in Cornwall